This is a list of episodes for The Daily Show with Jon Stewart in 2007.

2007

January

February

March

April

May

June

July

August

September

October

November

There were no further episodes produced in November due to the 2007–08 Writers Guild of America strike.

December
There were no episodes produced in December due to the 2007–08 Writers Guild of America strike.

References

 
Daily Show guests
Daily Show guests (2007)